Shap Yi Wat is a village in Sha Tin District, Hong Kong.

Administration
Shap Yi Wat is a recognized village under the New Territories Small House Policy.

History
Shap Yi Wat had a population of six in 1911.

See also
 Kau Yeuk (Sha Tin)
 Sha Tin Pass

References

External links

 Delineation of area of existing village Shap Yi Wat (Sha Tin) for election of resident representative (2019 to 2022)

Villages in Sha Tin District, Hong Kong